Gallaudet is may refer to

People
 Gallaudet (surname)

Business and economy
 Gallaudet Aircraft Company

Military
 Gallaudet DB-1, United States day bomber prototype designed during World War I

Places
 Gallaudet University
Gallaudet University Press, university publisher that focuses on issues relating to deafness and sign language
 NoMa–Gallaudet U station, is an island platformed station on the Washington Metropolitan Area Transit Authority's (WMATA) Metro system